Valda Emily Unthank (née Garnham, 1909 – 21 June 1987) was an Australian cyclist who held numerous records for long distance cycling, mostly set during 1938-39, most notably the women's seven day record.

Valda was born in 1909 as "Emily Garnham" at Lilliput, Victoria to William and Edith Garnham (née Blackburne). In 1933 she married John Leslie Roberts "Jack" Unthank, a Councillor at the Victorian League of Wheelmen.

What first established Unthank's reputation though was the ride in October 1938 from Adelaide to Melbourne covering  in 33 hours 43 minutes. Unthank was sponsored by Austral bikes, a brand within the Malvern Star group, and the rides were organised by Jack O'Donohue, publicity manager for Bruce Small Ltd.

In June Unthank traveled to Queensland where she set a new 12 hour record of  before returning to Victoria to set the  record in 51 min 40 sec.

1939 culminated in riding  over seven days for what was claimed as a women's world record, bettering the  set by Joyce Barry in September 1938. The seven day record was also sponsored by the Metropolitan Gas Company who supplied a "modern gas kitchen" to cook all Unthank's meals. Unthank also appeared in an advertisement for Peters Ice Cream ("The health food of a nation") along with Hubert Opperman. Unthank's seven day record was eclipsed in March 1940 by the next Malvern Star woman rider, Pat Hawkins who rode .

World War II saw Unthank retire, although she returned for events competing on bicycle rollers to raise money for the Red Cross. 

Unthank died in June 1987 at the age of 78.

References

1909 births
1987 deaths
Australian female cyclists
Cyclists from Melbourne
Ultra-distance cyclists